Pete & Sam's Reality News is a British television series, which is broadcast by Channel 4 on E4, All4, YouTube and Snapchat.

In each episode TOWIE's Pete Wicks and Made in Chelsea's Sam Thompson discuss reality tv news and updates. It parodies news anchor shows, speaking solely about developments on reality TV shows. Each week the presenters are joined by guests. As of 2022, two seasons of the show have aired on British television.

Background
The Made in Chelsea and The Only Way is Essex presenters first met on the reality series Celebs Go Dating in 2018. Since then, they have had a well-documented friendship. They began a reality news segment on Instagram, before it was picked up by Channel 4 in 2021.

It first aired on E4 on 25 January 2021 with 15 minute episodes.

Broadcast
An initial six episodes were broadcast on Instagram, follow by the first season broadcast in January 2021 on E4. It was renewed for a second season, which premiered on 18 October 2021.

Episodes

References

2021 British television series debuts
2020s British reality television series
2020s British satirical television series
E4 (TV channel) original programming
English-language television shows
Television series by Universal Television